Yellow & Green is the third studio album by the American sludge metal band Baroness. The double album was released on July 17, 2012, through Relapse Records. On May 14, 2012, the first single "Take My Bones Away" was revealed on Baroness' official YouTube channel. The second single "March to the Sea" was released on June 13, 2012. The third single "Eula" was debuted on Liquid Metal Sirius XM on June 18, 2012.

Yellow & Green is the last Baroness album with founding drummer Allen Blickle.

Reception 

Yellow & Green debuted at number 75 on the Canadian Albums Chart and at number 30 on the Billboard 200, selling over 12,000 copies its first week.  The album has sold 57,000 copies in the United States as of November 2015.

The album was listed 18th on Stereogum's list of top 50 albums of 2012.

Track listing

Personnel 
John Dyer Baizley – lead vocals, rhythm guitar, bass, keyboards
Pete Adams – lead guitar, backing vocals
Allen Blickle – drums

Charts

References 

Baroness (band) albums
2012 albums
Relapse Records albums
Albums with cover art by John Dyer Baizley
Albums produced by John Congleton